The 2018 Liga 2 was the second season of the Liga 2 under its current name, and the ninth season under its current league structure.

PSS won the title after a 2–0 win over Semen Padang in the final at Pakansari Stadium, Cibinong on 4 December 2018.

Overview

Player regulations
Clubs could register at least 18 players and a maximum of 30 players without age restriction like the previous season, but maximum 3 players over the age of 35 years. Like the previous season, the clubs also couldn't use foreign players.

Teams

Teams changes
The following teams have changed division since the 2017 season.

To Liga 2
Relegated from Liga 1
 Persegres
 Persiba
 Semen Padang
Promoted from Liga 3
 Blitar United
 Persik Kendal
 Aceh United

From Liga 2
Promoted to Liga 1
 Persebaya
 PSMS
 PSIS
Relegated to Liga 3

Stadium and locations

Notes:

Personnel and kits
Note: Flags indicate national team as has been defined under FIFA eligibility rules. Players and coaches may hold more than one non-FIFA nationality.

Coaching changes

First round

West region

East region

Second round
This round began on 24 October 2018 and ended on 21 November 2018. Eight teams competed in this round.

Group A

Group B

Knockout round

Bracket

Semi-finals

Semen Padang won 3–2 on aggregate.

PSS won 2–0 on aggregate.

Third place

Final

Season statistics

Top scorers

See also
 2018 Liga 1
 2018 Liga 3
 2018–19 Piala Indonesia

Notes

References

Works cited
 

Liga 2
Liga 2
Liga 2
Liga 2
Indonesia
Indonesia